Minoritaire was a 1982 album by Jean-Jacques Goldman, his second solo album sung in French. It was certified platinum in France in 1983, another in 1991 and another in 2001, for a total sales of 900,000 copies.

It was recorded at the Studio Gang by Olivier do Espirito Santo and Jean-Pierre Janiaud. It was released by NEF and produced by Marc Lumbroso.

Track listing
"Au bout de mes rêves"
"Comme toi"
"Toutes mes chaines"
"Jeanine Medicament Blues"
"Veiller tard"
"Quand la musique est bonne"
"Je ne vous parlerai pas d'elle"
"Être le premier"
"Si tu m'emmènes"
"Minoritaire"
"Quand la bouteille est vide"

Personnel

Guy Delacroix - bass
Christophe Deschamps, Marc Chantereau - percussion
Albane Alcalay, Guy Alcalay, Jean-Jacques Goldman, Jean-Pierre Janiaud - vocals
Jean-Yves d'Angelo, Jean-Jacques Goldman - keyboards
Claude Engel, Jean-Jacques Goldman - acoustic guitar
Claude Engel, Jean-Jacques Goldman, Nono Krief (Jeanine Medicament Blues, Minoritaire), Patrice Tison - electric guitar
"Jumpin" Ramon Roche - piano (Minoritaire)
Patrick Bourgoin, Philippe Delacroix-Herpin - saxophone
Georges Rodi - synthesizer
Patrick Mondon - violin (Comme toi)

References

1982 albums
Jean-Jacques Goldman albums